The Tower of David is an ancient citadel located near the Old City of Jerusalem.

Tower of David may also refer to:

 Centro Financiero Confinanzas nicknamed "Tower of David", a skyscraper in Caracas, Venezuela
 "Tower of David" (Homeland), a 2013 episode of the TV series Homeland
 Tower of David Period, a nickname describing Israeli art in the 1920s